The Mappin Baronetcy, of Thornbury in the Township of Upper Hallam in the Parish of Sheffield in the West Riding of the County of York, was a title in the Baronetage of the United Kingdom. It was created on 27 August 1886 for the factory owner and Liberal politician Frederick Mappin. The title became extinct on the death of the sixth Baronet in 1975.

Mappin baronets, of Thornbury (1886)
Sir Frederick Thorpe Mappin, 1st Baronet (1821–1910)
Sir Frank Mappin, 2nd Baronet (1846–1920)
Sir Wilson Mappin, 3rd Baronet (1848–1925)
Sir Charles Thomas Hewitt Mappin, 4th Baronet (1909–1941)
Sir Samuel Wilson Mappin, 5th Baronet (1854–1942)
Sir Frank Crossley Mappin, 6th Baronet (1884–1975)

Arms

References

Extinct baronetcies in the Baronetage of the United Kingdom